Aran Zalewski (born 21 March 1991) is an Australian field hockey player who is the captain of the Australian national team.

Personal
He is from Margaret River, Western Australia. he attended Aquinas College in Perth, Western Australia.  As a 12- and 13-year-old, he played in the Margaret River South West League.

Field hockey
He is a centre-half.
He played junior hockey in Margaret River.  As a 12- and 13-year-old, he played in the Margaret River South West League.

He made his state team debut when he was 15 years old.

National team
He participated in a training camp for the first time in October 2011.
He had his first call up to the national team in October 2011 in a game against India at the Bunbury Hockey Stadium.  He scored a goal in his debut in the 57th minute, a game Australia won 5–0.

In December 2011, he was named as one of fourteen players to be on the 2012 Summer Olympics Australian men's national Olympic development squad.  While this squad is not in the top twenty-eight and separate from the Olympic training coach, the Australian coach Ric Charlesworth did not rule out selecting from only the training squad, with players from the Olympic development having a chance at possibly being called up to represent Australia at the Olympics.  He trained with the team from 18 January to mid-March in Perth, Western Australia. He was named the best player of the 2019 FIH Pro League after Australia won the first edition of the FIH Pro League. In December 2019, he was nominated for the FIH Player of the Year Award.

Zalewski was selected in the Kookaburras Olympics squad for the Tokyo 2020 Olympics. The team reached the final for the first time since 2004 but couldn't achieve gold, beaten by Belgium in a shootout.

References

External links
 
 
 
 

1991 births
Living people
Australian people of Polish descent
Australian male field hockey players
Male field hockey midfielders
2014 Men's Hockey World Cup players
Field hockey players at the 2014 Commonwealth Games
Field hockey players at the 2016 Summer Olympics
Field hockey players at the 2018 Commonwealth Games
Field hockey players at the 2022 Commonwealth Games
2018 Men's Hockey World Cup players
Olympic field hockey players of Australia
Commonwealth Games medallists in field hockey
Commonwealth Games gold medallists for Australia
People from Margaret River, Western Australia
Field hockey players at the 2020 Summer Olympics
Olympic silver medalists for Australia
Medalists at the 2020 Summer Olympics
Olympic medalists in field hockey
20th-century Australian people
21st-century Australian people
People educated at Aquinas College, Perth
Sportsmen from Western Australia
2023 Men's FIH Hockey World Cup players
Medallists at the 2014 Commonwealth Games
Medallists at the 2018 Commonwealth Games
Medallists at the 2022 Commonwealth Games